Nikolayevka is a village in Ufimsky District of the Republic of Bashkortostan, Russia. Its postal code is 450532.

References 

Rural localities in Ufimsky District